The Namdroling Nyingmapa Monastery (or Thegchog Namdrol Shedrub Dargye Ling)(བོད་ཡིག ཐེག་མཆོག་རྣམ་གྲོལ་བཤད་སྒྲུབ་དར་རྒྱས་གླིང་།) (Wylie: theg mchog rnam grol bshad sgrub dar rgyas gling) is the largest teaching center of the Nyingma lineage of Tibetan Buddhism in the world. Located in Bylakuppe, part of the Mysuru district of the state of Karnataka, the monastery is home to a sangha community of over five thousand lamas (both monks and nuns), a junior high school named Yeshe Wodsal Sherab Raldri Ling, a religious college (or shedra for both monks and nuns) and hospital.

History 
The monastery was established by the 11th throneholder of the Palyul lineage, Drubwang Padma Norbu Rinpoche in 1963, following his 1959 exit from Tibet as the second seat of the  Palyul Monastery, one of the six great Nyingmapa Mother monasteries of Tibet prior to annexation.

The monastery's full name is Thegchog Namdrol Shedrub Dargyeling, called "Namdrolling or Namdroling" for short. It is carved into the jungle that the Indian government granted to Tibetan exiles. The initial challenges included rampaging elephants and other tropical dangers.

Branches
 Namdroling Jr. High School (Yeshe Wodsal Sherab Raldri Ling)
 Ngagyur Nyingma Institute (NNI)
 Ngagyur Rigzod Editorial Committee (NREC)
 Rigzod Computer Section (RCS)
 Palyul Dictionary Editorial Committee
 Padma Mani Translation Committee (PMTC)
 Ngagyur Nyingma Research Center (NNRC)
 Ngagyur Nyingma Nunnery (NNN)
 Ngagyur Nyingma Nunnery Institute (NNNI)
 Tshogyal Editorial Committee (TEC)
 Samtan Odsalling Retreat Center
 Nunnery Retreat Center (Drub Nyi Gatshal Ling)
 TT Daycare Medical Center (TTDCMC)
 PDL Guest House

Dharma Centres Around the Globe
 Canada
 Ogyan Osel Chodzong Monastery & Retreat Centre
 Ottawa Palyul Center - Dhonyag Shedrup Ling
 Palyul Namdroling Foundation
 Palyul Pema mani Center
 The Palyul Foundation of Canada
 Hong Kong
 Penor Rinpoche Charity Foundation Ltd.
 India
 Palyul Changchub Dargyeling, Dirang, Arunachal Pradesh
 Palyul Namdroling Temple, Bodh Gaya, Bihar
 Tsechu Association, Darjeeling
 Indonesia
 Palyul Nyingma Indonesia
 Macau
 Macau Palyul Centre
 Malaysia
 Nyingma Palyul Buddhist Association Selangor and Kuala Lumpur
 Yayasan Pema Norbu Vihara
 Nepal
 Nyingma Palyul Orgyen Dorje Chholing Monastery
 Nyingma Palyul Retreat Centre
 Palyul Thegchog Wodsel Choling
 The Philippines 
 Philippine Palyul Centre
 Singapore
 Palyul Nyingma Buddhist Association
 Taiwan
 Palyul Nyingmapa Buddhist Centre
 Sheng Keng Palyul Centre
 Shien Tein Palyul Centre
 Taichung Palyul Centre
 Tainan Palyul Centre
 Taipei Palyul Centre
 Taiwan Nyingmapa Palyul Namdroling Buddhist Association
 USA
 Namdroling Montana, MT
 Nyingma Palyul Dharma Centre, NY
 Palyul Changchub Choling, FL
 Palyul Changchub Dargyeling, CA
 Palyul Changchub Dargyeling, MD
 Palyul Changchub Dargyeling, TX
 Palyul Changchub Dargyeling, VA
 Palyul Changchub Dargyeyling Buddhist Study & Meditation Centre, OH
 The Palyul Retreat Centre, NY

Buildings - Timeline 
 On 17 February 1978, the Buddhist College ("Shedra") was constructed and completed.
 A new temple, the "Padmasambhava Buddhist Vihara" (known by locals as the "Golden Temple") was inaugurated on 24 September 1999.  The temple has space for several thousand monks.
 27 November 1993, the Ngagyur Nyingma Nunnery mTsho-rGyal bShad-Drub Dargyas-Ling was established.
 In 2004 Zangdog Palri Temple a temple to the main Nyingma (old school) Buddha, Guru Rinpoche was built and inaugurated on 13 December of that year.

As of 2016, the lodging facilities alone for the school include three buildings with over 200 rooms.  The population fluctuates as monks attend or complete studies at Namdroling.  A recent census had the population in excess of 4,000 monks and 800 nuns.

Ceremonies 

Namdroling Monastery hosts several ceremonies yearly.  Of particular interest is Tibetan New Year (Losar), based on the Lunar Calendar; dates are not static but usually occurring in the months of February or March.  The monastery hosts traditional Lama Dances, oversize Thankga hanging from the sides of its buildings, as well as solemn processions throughout the monastery grounds spanning approximately two weeks.

See also
Namdroling Monastery in India
Palyul Centers: Namdroling Monastery, South India

Image gallery

References

Further reading
 Zangpo, Tsering Lama Jampal (1988), A Garland of Immortal Wish-Fulfilling Trees, Ithaca, NY: Snow Lion Publications. , 
 Nyoshul Khen Rinpoche (2005), "A Marvelous Garland of Rare Gems: Biographies of Masters of Awareness in the Dzogchen Lineage", Junction City, CA: Padma Publishing.

External links 

Namdroling Monastery in India
Palyul Centers: Namdroling Monastery, South India

Buddhist sites in Karnataka
Nyingma monasteries and temples
Buddhist monasteries in India
Buildings and structures in Mysore district
Tourist attractions in Mysore district
Buddhist temples in India